Order of Construction is one of the badges of honor in Iran, established by "The Council of Iran Ministers" on November 21, 1990. According to "Article 11" of the "Regulations on the Awarding of Government Orders" of Iran, the "Order of Construction" due to praising the efforts being made to reconstruction the country, is awarded to people who have made significant efforts in one of the following ways:

 Development of civil and building of the country, especially in deprived areas
 Reconstruction of war and disaster-affected areas
 Presenting designs and successful civil development plans
 Increasing the quantity and quality of products that are essential to the country's economic prosperity

Recipients

Types
The "Order of Construction" has three types of medal:

See also
 Order of Freedom (Iran)
 Order of Altruism
 Order of Work and Production
 Order of Research
 Order of Mehr
 Order of Justice (Iran)
 Order of Knowledge
 Order of Education and Pedagogy
 Order of Persian Politeness
 Order of Independence (Iran)
 Order of Service
 Order of Courage (Iran)
 Order of Culture and Art
 Order of Merit and Management
 Order of Fath
 Order of Islamic Republic
 Order of Nasr

References

External links
 Orders of Iran Regulations in diagrams
 Orders of Iran in diagrams
 Types of Iran's badges and their material benefits

CS1 uses Persian-language script (fa)
Awards established in 1990
Civil awards and decorations of Iran
1990 establishments in Iran